Kemnay House is a 17th-century tower house, now incorporated in a later house, about  south and west of Inverurie, Aberdeenshire, Scotland, and  south of Kemnay, to the south of the River Don.

History
During the 16th century, Kemnay was a property of the Douglases of Glenbervie.  It was acquired by the Crombie family, who built the present house.  Thomas Burnett of Leys purchased it in 1688; he was subsequently imprisoned in the Bastille, Paris, at the instigation of Jacobite enemies.

Alterations, including the extension of the wings, took place in 1833.  The house is still occupied.

Structure
The original tower house was a tall L-plan building.  The entrance in the reentrant angle, above which a stair turret arises this from the second floor, has been replaced.  There is a vaulted basement, with the kitchen in the wing.
The cream-washed walls are pierced by small windows.
The three-storey wing, which has a bell gable, was an addition in 1688.  There are traces of a curtain wall.  The porch on the west front, and a granite water tower, were additions in 1833.

See also
Castles in Great Britain and Ireland
List of castles in Scotland

References

Castles in Aberdeenshire